Caltoris cormasa, the full stop swift, is a species of skipper butterfly found in the Indomalayan realm from India to Malaya

References

cormasa
Fauna of Pakistan
Butterflies of Asia
Butterflies of Singapore
Butterflies of Indochina